USS DuPage may refer to:

  a self-propelled barracks ship which operated in a noncommissioned status in the Pacific area during 1951–59.

United States Navy ship names